Siutghiol is a lagoon on the shores of the Black Sea, in Constanța County, Northern Dobruja, Romania.

Ovidiu Island is a small island on the west side of the lake,  from the town of Ovidiu. On the east side of the lake is the resort town of Mamaia, which lies on a strip of land  in length and only  in width, between the Black Sea and Lake Siutghiol.

Etymology
The name of the lake comes from the Turkish Sütgöl, meaning "the milk lake".

References

Lakes of Constanța County
Saline lakes of Europe
Lagoons of Romania
Important Bird Areas of Romania